Carleton Watson Angell (February 26, 1887 – June 1, 1962) was an American sculptor. He was born in Belding, Michigan and died in Ann Arbor, Michigan. He is buried in Washtenong Memorial Gardens near the World War I Veterans Memorial, under a plaque designed by artist Stanley Kellogg.

Career
Angell studied sculpture at the School of the Art Institute of Chicago and while in Chicago did some designing, and likely modeling, for the American Terra Cotta Company and the Ceramic Company. In 1922, he and his wife Gladys moved to Ann Arbor when he was hired by the University of Michigan to teach freehand drawing. In 1926 he became the Museums Artist where he created, among things, plaster models of various animals, many of them prehistoric, that were used in the museum's displays. In the course of his 30 years at the University of Michigan he also created numerous portraits and busts and plaques of U of M notables, and these can be found spread all over the university campus.

Public works

 Girl with a Cat, Bath School disaster memorial, James Couzens Memorial Auditorium, Bath Middle School, Bath, Michigan, 1928
 Veterans Memorial, Washtenaw Memorial Gardens, Ann Arbor, Michigan, 1932
 Pumas  Museum of Natural History, University of Michigan, Ann Arbor Michigan, 1940
 Four Chaplains Memorial, Arbor Crest memorial Park, Ann Arbor, Michigan, 1954

Architectural sculpture
 Cartouche over main entrance, Museum of Natural History, University of Michigan, Ann Arbor Michigan, Albert Kahn, architect, 1928
 Two panels, Washtenaw County Courthouse, Ann Arbor, Michigan, Ralph Gerganoff, architect, 1956

References

 Catalog of Works of Art by Carleton Watson Angell, Artist, University Museums, University of Michigan, 1926 - 1955, Ann Arbor: University Museums, 1955
 Kvaran, Einar Einarsson, Annotated Inventory of Outdoor Sculpture in Washtenaw County, 1989 study

1887 births
1962 deaths
Artists from Ann Arbor, Michigan
University of Michigan people
20th-century American sculptors
20th-century American male artists
American male sculptors
People from Belding, Michigan
Sculptors from Michigan